The 1956–57 season was Fussball Club Basel 1893's 63rd season in their existence. It was their eleventh consecutive season in the top flight of Swiss football after their promotion from the Nationalliga B in 1945–46. They played their home games in the Landhof, in the Wettstein Quarter in Kleinbasel. Jules Düblin was again the club's chairman. At the AGM he was voted as club chairman for his eleventh successive term.

Overview 
The Hungarian ex-international footballer Béla Sárosi who had been hired in as new team manager the previous season continued as coach this season. Basel played a total of 41 games this season. Of these 41 matches 26 were in the domestic league, three matches were in the Swiss Cup and 12 were friendly matches. The friendly games resulted in five victories, two draws and five defeats. In total, including the test games and the cup competition, 21 games were won, seven were drawn and 13 were lost. In their 41 games they scored 78 and conceded 65 goals.

There were fourteen teams contesting the 1956–57 Nationalliga A, these were the top 12 teams from the previous season and the two newly promoted teams Winterthur and Young Fellows Zürich. Again this season, the bottom two teams in the table were to be relegated. Basel won 15 of their 26 games and drew four times and lost seven times. They scored 53 goals and conceded 48. Basel ended the championship with 34 points in 4th position. They were 11 points behind the new champions Young Boys. At the end of the league season, Zürich and Young Fellows Zürich were level with 14 points, joint second last, and therefore they had to play a relegation play-off. Young Fellows won this play-off match and therefore Zürich suffered relegation together with Schaffhausen who had finished in last position.

Josef Hügi was the team's top league goal scorer with 22 goals. He managed three hat-tricks during the league season, in the home match against Zürich (26 August 1956), in the home game against Chiasso (28 October) and in the away game against La Chaux-de-Fonds (3 March 1957). Hügi (II) was third in the league top scorer list, behind Adrien Kauer from La Chaux-de-Fonds with 29 goals and Branislav Vukosavljević from Grasshopper Club who had scored 26 times. Gottlieb Stäuble was the team's second best goal scorer with 10 goals, Peter-Jürgen Sanmann netted eight times and both Hermann Suter and Hansueli Oberer netted six times.

Basel joined the Swiss Cup in the third principal round. They were drawn away against lower tier local team SC Burgdorf and won 1–0. In the fourth round they were drawn away to lower tier Luzern and this ended in a goalless draw after over time. The replay was held at the Landhof but here Basel were knocked out. La Chaux-de-Fonds won the competition.

Players 
The following is the list of the Basel first team squad during the season 1956–57. The list includes players that were in the squad on the day that the Nationalliga A season started on 26 August 1956 but subsequently left the club after that date.

 

 

 
 
 

 

Players who left the squad

Results 
Legend

Friendly matches

Pre- and mid-season

Winter break to end of season

Nationalliga A

League matches

League table

Swiss Cup

See also 
 History of FC Basel
 List of FC Basel players
 List of FC Basel seasons

References

Sources 
 Die ersten 125 Jahre. Publisher: Josef Zindel im Friedrich Reinhardt Verlag, Basel. 
 The FCB team 1956–57 at fcb-archiv.ch
 Switzerland 1956–57 by Erik Garin at Rec.Sport.Soccer Statistics Foundation

External links 
 FC Basel official site

FC Basel seasons
Basel